Nura Luluyeva (1960 – 2000) was a Chechen woman who was kidnapped and murdered by a Russian death squad in 2000.

Abduction
In the morning of 3 June 2000, Nura Luluyeva, an unemployed nurse and kindergarten teacher and the mother of four children (ages 6–21), was selling strawberries on Mozdokskaya Street of Grozny, the capital of Chechnya, with her cousins Markha Gakayeva (b. 1962) and Raisa Gakayeva (b. 1964). A group of armed men in ski masks suddenly raided the marketplace on top of an armoured personnel carrier with a hull number 110; their leader told a witness that he was from the FSB and some of "their guys" have been killed there. The servicemen detained Luluyeva along with her two cousins, two other women, and at least one other person. A local policeman, trying to stop them, got into a heated argument and was fired on before the APC drove away with the detainees.

Luluyeva and her cousins  "disappeared". A search by her husband Said-Alvi Luluyev, a former Soviet-era judge from Gudermes, did not bring any results, despite him contacting authorities from different ministries at various levels, petitioning, and even personally looking for her in detention centres and prisons in Chechnya and beyond in North Caucasus. There was also no official record of any operation conducted on Mozdokskaya Street on this day. Meanwhile, the whole market was looted and destroyed in a raid by armored vehicles in November 2000, after the total of 18 Russian servicemen were reportedly either killed or kidnapped there since March of the same year.

Discovery
In February 2001, eight months after the abduction and shortly after the official investigation was "suspended for lack of information", dead bodies of the missing women were discovered among some 60 mostly disfigured corpses uncovered from a dumping ground in an abandoned Zdorovye dacha summer house settlement located in the vicinity of Khankala, the main Russian military base in Chechnya outside Grozny. Many of the cadavers found there were blindfolded and had their arms bound behind their backs; some of the bodies were missing ears and showing signs of torture, and several were booby-trapped.

As the bodies of Nura Luluyeva and her cousins were in an advanced stage of decomposition, they could be identified only by their earrings and clothes. An autopsy of Luluyeva showed that she died from a multiple strong blows to the head with a solid blunt object at least three months before the discovery of the corpse-dumping site. Her body was then taken to be buried in her home village.

International hearing
On 10 November 2006, in the case of Luluyev and Others v. Russia, the European Court of Human Rights found that Russia had violated the European Convention on Human Rights on five separate counts: right to life, right to effective investigation, prohibition of inhuman or degrading treatment (applicants), right to liberty and security, right to an effective remedy. In the judgement, the Court announced that it "could not but conclude that Nura Luluyeva was apprehended and detained by [unidentified] state servicemen. There existed a body of evidence that attained the standard of proof "beyond reasonable doubt", which made it possible to hold the state authorities responsible for Nura Luluyeva's death." However, "the description of the injuries found on her body by the forensic experts did not permit the Court to conclude beyond reasonable doubt that she had been tortured or otherwise ill-treated prior to her death. The Court ordered Moscow to pay nearly 70,000 euros in damages to members of her family.

See also
Killing of Elza Kungayeva
Mass graves in Chechnya

References

External links 
CHECHNYA'S MISSING MOURNED, The Boston Globe,  March 17, 2001
BACKGROUND ON THE IDENTIFIED BODIES: Nura Lulueva, Markha Gakaeva, Raisa Gakaeva, and Aset Elbuzdukueva, Human Rights Watch, May 2001
Court finds Russia responsible for Chechnya deaths, Reuters/AlertNet, 09 Nov 2006
Russian Federation: European Court ruling in two cases from the Chechen Republic, Amnesty International, 9 November 2006
European Court Rules Against Russia, The Washington Post, November 10, 2006
Kremlin 'was complicit in Chechen murders', The Independent, 10 November 2006

2000 deaths
Article 2 of the European Convention on Human Rights
Article 3 of the European Convention on Human Rights
Chechen murder victims
Chechen nurses
Chechen victims of human rights abuses
Deaths by person in Russia
Female murder victims
People murdered in Russia
Prisoners who died in Russian detention
Russian people of Chechen descent
War crimes of the Second Chechen War
Women in the Chechen wars